Chai Lu (born 26 March 1977) is a Chinese host for China Central Television.

Biography
Chai Lu was born in Xi'an, Shaanxi in March 1977, she elementary studied at Xi'an No.2 School.

She entered Communication University of China in 1995, majoring in broadcast, where he graduated in 1999, she received her MPA degree from Tsinghua University in 2005, majoring in public management.

Chai Lu joined the China Central Television in 1998, he hosted Across the Strait between 1999 and 2007, she hosted Midnight News, Live News, World Express, News 30 Minutes.

Works

Television
 Across the Strait
 Midnight News
 Live News
 World Express
 News 30 Minutes

References

External links

CCTV: Chai Lu
Chai Lu Blog

1977 births
People from Xi'an
Communication University of China alumni
Tsinghua University alumni
Living people